Kevin Dorff (born August 2, 1966) is an American actor and comedian known for his work as a writer and sketch performer on Late Night with Conan O'Brien and The Tonight Show with Conan O'Brien, the former of which he won a Primetime Emmy for in 2007. Dorff co-starred as "Mike the Federal Agent" on the first season of the Adult Swim series Delocated with his former Late Night colleague Jon Glaser. His character was written off the show at the start of season two, as Dorff was in Los Angeles writing for The Tonight Show at the time, while Delocated is filmed in New York City. Dorff returned to work on Delocated as a writer in season three. He has recently been a writer for Review and has made one appearance on the show.

Dorff has made guest appearances on television programs such as TV Funhouse, Nick Swardson's Pretend Time, Important Things with Demetri Martin, 30 Rock, Parks and Recreation, The Office, Detroiters, Arrested Development, and Brooklyn Nine-Nine. In 2019, he portrayed Bill O'Reilly in the film Bombshell.

Recurring characters on Late Night with Conan O'Brien
Coked-up Werewolf
Jesus Christ
Mansy the half-man/half-pansy
Joe's Bartender
Todd the Tiny Guy
Crazy Chainsaw Murderer Guy

References

External links

1966 births
Living people
Male actors from Chicago
American male comedians
American male television actors
American television writers
American male television writers
Screenwriters from Illinois
Comedians from Illinois
21st-century American comedians
21st-century American screenwriters
21st-century American male writers